HMS Favorite was an 18-gun , launched in 1806 and broken up in 1821. In her career she sailed as far North America, the Caribbean, Africa, South America, and the Far East. She captured or recaptured several merchant ships and a handful of privateers.

Napoleonic Wars
Commander John Mairne in November 1806 commissioned Favorite for the Channel Station. On 21 May 1807 he sailed with a convoy for Africa. On 22 October Favorite arrived at Barbados after a seven-week voyage, having escorted five slave ships from Bance Island, one of the last British convoys of such vessels.

She then served under the command of Commander William Standway Parkinson in the Leeward Islands. He was promoted to post captain on 9 February 1808 when he arrived at the Admiralty with the dispatches announcing the surrender of the Danish West Indian colonies.

Her primary role was to protect trade from privateers operating out of Cuba.

On 24 May Favorite was at Falmouth, Jamaica, when a fire broke out in the town. Clement landed his crew and they saved much property, the hospital, and many houses. While fighting the fire fell through the roof of a house, sustaining some injuries. Subsequently, yellow fever started to devastate his crew, many of whom died; Clement himself survived three attacks. With only 45 men able to man her, Favorite escorted a convoy of 60 merchant vessels, holding five hovering privateers at bay.

When he made use of an impress warrant, properly signed by the Governor and a magistrate, in Montego Bay, he was forced to pay £535 damages when two actions were brought against him. (Although the loss was incurred in the course of his duty, he never recovered any money.)

In January 1809 Favorite sailed to Curacoa and Clement visited Caracas.

At some point Clement captured a Spanish letter of marque named Esperance, of 10 guns and 40 men. This took place after the United Kingdom and Spain had declared peace, but before official word had reached Jamaica. Esperances owners sued Clement in the Vice admiralty court in Jamaica. Although the court found in Clement's favor, defending himself cost Clement £300.

On 27 July 1809 Favorite sailed from Jamaica as escort to a convoy of 36 merchant vessels to England.  On 27 August the convoy encountered a hurricane during which several merchant vessels foundered. Favorite arrived at Deal on 18 September, having lost her top masts and having sustained other damage.

Favorite then served on the Plymouth station.

On 9 May 1810,  was eight leagues off The Lizard when she was finally able to capture the French privateer schooner Dorade after a seven-hour chase. Dorade carried ten guns and a crew of 43 men under the command of Emmanuel Ives Le Roux. Favorite had joined the chase and it was fire from Favorite that brought down the privateer's main and foretop masts, enabling Orestes to effect the capture. Dorade was a new vessel on her first cruise; she had left the Île de Batz only the previous evening and had made no captures.  arrived at Plymouth on 17 May.

On 17 December the Swedish vessel Neutrality arrived at Plymouth. She had been sailing from London to Alicante in ballast when Favorite detained her.

Favorite also drove a convoy on shore near the Isle of Bas under the fire of two shore batteries and recaptured several British merchant vessels.

Captain Clement was promoted to post captain on 1 August 1811.

Favorite was reclassified as a post ship. Captain Robert Forbes then took command.

On 21 January 1812 Union, Corbetta, master, arrived at Falmouth. She had been sailing from Corruna to London when a French privateer had captured her. However, Favorite had recaptured Union.

The French privateer Brestois captured Vigilant, Stevens, master, on 13 January as Vigilant was sailing from Demerara to Liverpool. Favorite recaptured Vigilant and sent her into Plymouth, where she arrived on 26 January.

On 10 February Two Brothers, Dixey, master, of Saint-Malo, arrived at Plymouth after Favorite had detained her. 
 
Captain John Maxwell took command of Favorite on 27 April 1812. On 5 January Lloyd's List reported that Favorite had recaptured and sent into Plymouth Guardian, Musgrave, master, which the French privateer Augusta had captured as Guardian was sailing from Suriname to London. Augusta had also captured two other merchantmen that  had recaptured.

Favorite sailed for the West Coast of Africa on 2 June 1813 and had arrived by mid-July; she was at Cape Coast Castle by August. Maxwell visited all the British settlements on the coast of Africa, destroyed several slave forts on the Rio Pongus and captured four Portuguese slavers.

In 1814 Favorite went int Ordinary at Woolwich. Between June and October she was under the command of Captain John Maples as she underwent repairs at Woolwich.

Captain the Honourable James Ashley Maude received promotion to post captain on 11 March 1814. He then recommissioned Favorite on 14 October. He sailed her to North America and in her brought home the ratification (17 February 1815) by the United States Senate of the Treaty of Ghent that ended the War of 1812. He arrived at the Foreign office on 13 March 1815.

Post-war
After the battle of Waterloo, Captain Maude sailed Favorite to India with the news of Napoleon's defeat. She apparently reached Madras on the same day that the overland express arrived there.

On 17 June 1816 Favorite detained  and sent her into Bombay for adjudication. The Vice admiralty court found that Sullimany had been carrying 14 Negro slaves and confiscated them.

In July 1816, Maude discovered eight islands on the southern side of the Persian Gulp, previously unknown to European navigators.

Favorite left Trincomalee, Ceylon, for home on 26 December 1816. Favorite was at the Cape of Good Hope for a month. She left St Helena on 29 March 1817 and arrived back at Portsmouth on 25 May. By June 1817 Favorite was at Deptford about to be paid off.

Between September and December Favorite was at Deptford, refitting for foreign service. Captain Hercules Robinson recommissioned her in September. He sailed her for St. Helena, River Plate, and Newfoundland. Favorite returned via Gibraltar and Cadiz, arriving home on 21 December 1820. She then was paid off.

Fate
Favorite was broken up at Portsmouth in February 1821.

Notes, citations, and references
Notes

Citations

References

 

1806 ships
Sloops of the Royal Navy